This is a list of electoral results for the Electoral district of De Grey in Western Australian colonial elections.

Members for De Grey

Election results

Elections in the 1900s

Elections in the 1890s

References

Western Australian state electoral results by district